Nothing but Life is a 2004 bilingual English and Malayalam film directed by Rajiv Anchal for an Indian production house dealing with matters of health. The experimental film featured actors R. Madhavan, Neha Pendse, Kaveri, Nassar and Sreenivasan. The film had been made simultaneously in Malayalam and released later on as Made in USA on May 6, 2005.

Plot
Roby Thomas migrates to the U.S. with the help of a priest and works as a barman in a casino in Las Vegas. Roby is a simple youngster who believes in helping people in distress but he has a suicidal tendency. The film focuses on the inner turmoil of a youngster who seems to have a positive attitude towards life and emphasizes the importance of inter-personal relationship and friendship.

Cast

Production
Madhavan signed the film in June 2004 and began shooting for the film almost immediately. The film was initially titled Life in Las Vegas, before the makers decided on different titles in English and Malayalam. Actress Kaveri as heroine and actress Neha Pendse made her debut in South Indian films, whilst Nassar and Sreenivasan reprised the roles of the doctor alternatively in the English and Malayalam versions respectively. The film was shot within 40 days in Las Vegas, Albuquerque and New Mexico in the United States, whilst scenes were later recorded in New York City. The movie was shot using high-density television camera with cine lenses instead of a TV lens.

Release
The Malayalam version of the film opened to audiences in Kerala on 6 May 2005 gathering mixed reviews. Whilst one reviewer cited that "given the present crisis in Malayalam films where good themes are in short supply, "Made in USA" is certainly a welcome change"; another cited that the movie "left audience confused", describing the film as "plainly mediocre". The film became a financial failure at the Kerala box office, gaining poor collections.

The English film played across film festivals such as at the Kerala International Film Festival and then prepared for a release in India in August 2006, with director indicating that the film will be released across multiplex cinemas nationwide. The film won Surya S. Nair a Kerala State Award for her dubbing work in the film. The film was later dubbed in 2008 into Tamil and released as Ananda Punnagai, and then in Telugu as Anjali in America.

Soundtrack
The soundtrack for this film was composed by Vidyasagar and Biju Kurian. Biju Kurian has composed a song for the film, Vidyasagar has composed the remainder. Lyricists were O. N. V. Kurup and Rajiv Alunkal. The background score for this film was recorded by Ouseppachan.

References

External links
 

2004 films
2000s Malayalam-language films
English-language Indian films
Indian multilingual films
Films scored by Vidyasagar
2004 multilingual films
Films directed by Rajiv Anchal
2000s English-language films